Multiseat may refer to:
 Multiseat constituency, in voting systems 
 Multiseat configuration or "multiterminal", single computer which supports multiple independent users at the same time